32nd St. and Lancaster Ave. Philadelphia Armory, also known as the 32nd Street Armory or Drexel Armory, is a historic National Guard armory and multipurpose venue located in the University City neighborhood of Philadelphia, Pennsylvania.  Main entrances to the Armory are located at both 33rd and Cuthbert Street, and along Lancaster Walk.  Cuthbert Street is part of the Armory property and was removed from Philadelphia city street listing.  It was built in 1916, and is a trapezoidal shaped building in the Classical Revival style.  It is a three-story, 21,346 square foot, brick building with stone entablature and parapet.  It houses administrative offices, a gymnasium, and drill hall.  It was added to the National Register of Historic Places in 1991.

In 2008, Drexel University leased parts of the armory with plans to renovate it into a convocation and basketball arena for the use of Drexel athletics.  Eventually, the university abandoned the plans to convert the armory into its primary arena, and instead focused on renovating the current arena, the Daskalakis Athletic Center.  However, smaller scale renovations were completed at the armory and it is currently used for many events such as concerts, food events, art gatherings, and conventions.

Concerts

Drexel homecoming dance concert
The annual homecoming dance concert was held at the armory during the last week of January each year from 2009 to 2014.   Following the 2014 concert, the event was replaced by the Drexel Fall Fest.  Headlining performances included:
2014: DJ Carnage, GRiZ, ScHoolboy Q, Trinidad James
2013: Porter Robinson, Flosstradamus, Waka Flocka Flame
2012: Snoop Dogg, Wynter Gordon, DJ Serafin
2011: 
2010: Sean Paul, Jay Sean, DJ Serafin, Vita Chambers, East Hundred, Oh Snap!
2009: G-Eazy, Chiddy Bang, Mike Jones, DJ Jazzy Jeff

Drexel Spring Jam
The annual Spring Jam concert, which is organized by the Drexel CAB, is generally held during the Spring semester.  The Spring Jam was performed at the Drexel Armory until it was relocated to Lot F, an open parking area on Drexel's campus between Main Building and 31st Street, beginning in 2011.  The headlining acts of the Spring Jam concerts performed at the armory included:
2010: N.E.R.D., Kevin Rudolf
2009: Girl Talk, Lupe Fiasco
2008: Ben Folds
2007: Jack's Mannequin

Other concerts
January 27, 2017: Lil Uzi Vert, Mija, Valentino Khan
February 18, 2012: Alesso, LA Riots
May 5, 2010: Dave Hause
June 5, 2008: M.I.A., Holy Fuck
September 29, 1996: Goldfinger
December 10, 1994: Run–DMC, Method Man, Wu-Tang Clan, Warren G, Naughty by Nature, Dogg Pound, Craig Mack, Notorious B.I.G., Kid Capri
December 7, 1994: Toad the Wet Sprocket, Milla Jovovich
November 11, 1993: Digable Planets, Gumbo
November 8, 1993: Nirvana, The Breeders, Half Japanese
October 14, 1993: The Mighty Mighty Bosstones, Ruder Than You, Love Seed Mama Jump, Strange as Angels, Mr. Greengenes, Public Service, Tribes
October 1, 1993: Cypress Hill, House of Pain, Funkdoobiest, The Whooliganz

Sports

Buckley Courts
The Buckley Courts are three plexicushion multipurpose courts within the armory. They are named after Robert Buckley, an alumnus of the Drexel College of Engineering and a member of the Drexel Athletics Hall of Fame as a three-sport athlete. From 2008-2018, these courts serve as a practice site for club and varsity sports teams during the winter. They are also available to students for recreational sports including tennis, basketball, volleyball, badminton, indoor soccer, street hockey and table tennis.

Basketball
The armory was the home arena for the Drexel Dragons basketball teams from 1969 to 1975.

The armory hosted three regional games in the 1967 NCAA College Division basketball tournament

References

Armories on the National Register of Historic Places in Pennsylvania
Neoclassical architecture in Pennsylvania
Government buildings completed in 1916
University City, Philadelphia
College basketball venues in the United States
Drexel Dragons men's basketball
Drexel Dragons women's basketball
Drexel University
Sports venues in Philadelphia
Basketball venues in Pennsylvania
Defunct college basketball venues in the United States
Defunct indoor arenas in Pennsylvania
Military facilities on the National Register of Historic Places in Philadelphia